Alex Rider is a series of spy novels written by British author Anthony Horowitz. The novels revolve around a teenage spy named Alex Rider and is primarily aimed towards young adults. The series currently comprises thirteen novels, as well as six graphic novels, seven short stories, a supplementary book, and a TV series. In January 2022, Horowitz indicated that he hopes to start writing a fourteenth novel (titled Nightshade Revenge) later in 2022, and that it will be published in 2023.

The first novel, Stormbreaker, was released in the United Kingdom in the year 2000 and was adapted into a film in 2006, starring Alex Pettyfer. Walker Books published the first novels in the United Kingdom alongside Puffin in the United States, but more recent entries in the series were published by Philomel Books, an imprint of Penguin Books.

Novels

List
Stormbreaker - released 4 September 2000. Adapted as a graphic novel, released 3 July 2006.
Point Blanc - released 3 September 2001. Adapted as a graphic novel, released 27 December 2007.
Skeleton Key - released 8 July 2002. Adapted as a graphic novel, released 7 September 2009.
Eagle Strike - released 7 April 2003. Adapted as a graphic novel, released 6 July 2012.
Scorpia - released 1 April 2004. Adapted as a graphic novel, released February 2016.
Ark Angel - released 1 April 2005. Adapted as a graphic novel, released May 2020.
Snakehead - released 31 October 2007.
Crocodile Tears - released 10 November 2009.
Scorpia Rising - released 21 March 2011 in Australia, 22 March 2011 in the US and 31 March 2011 in the UK.
Russian Roulette - released 12 September 2013.
Never Say Die - released 1 June 2017 in the UK and 10 October 2017 in the US.
Secret Weapon - released 4 April 2019.
Nightshade - released 2 April 2020 in the UK and 7 April 2020 in the US.

A fourteenth book is expected to be released in 2023.

Stormbreaker

Stormbreaker was first published in the year 2000, in the United Kingdom, and then in the year 2001 in the United States. Alex, the main character, is recruited by MI6 after discovering the truth about his uncle's life and death. He is sent to complete his uncle's latest mission: to investigate a Lebanese multimillionaire named Herod Sayle and his creation: the revolutionary and newly-developed computer called Stormbreaker - which Sayle is donating to every school in England. Alex discovers that the Stormbreaker computers contain a lethal variation of smallpox and that Sayle plans to ruthlessly kill thousands of schoolchildren around the world with it. Alex foils the plan and succeeds on his first mission.

Point Blanc

Point Blanc was published in the United Kingdom in 2001, and in North America in 2002 under the alternate title Point Blank. After the deaths of two billionaires, MI6 discovers a connection: the two men who died each had a son attending Point Blanc, a school for rebellious sons of billionaires located in the French Alps, owned by Dr. Hugo Grief. MI6 sends Alex to investigate Point Blanc, where he discovers that Grief is replacing the students with clones of himself, who are altered through plastic surgery to resemble the students, including Alex himself, so Grief can inherit the fortune and gain the power to control the whole world. However, Alex foils his plan.

Skeleton Key

Skeleton Key was published in 2002. After foiling a Triad plot to fix the 2001 Wimbledon tennis tournament and befriending Sabina, Alex is in grave danger of assassination. Forced to leave the country, MI6 sends him on a mission to Cuba with two doubtful CIA agents, of whom he is the sole survivor. He encounters former Soviet general Alexei Sarov, who tries to adopt Alex and expresses ideas of a nuclear holocaust and world domination under communist rule. Alex then foils his plans saving the world for a third time.

Eagle Strike
Eagle Strike was published in 2003. Popstar Damian Cray hopes to destroy the drug-making countries of the world by hijacking the United States nuclear arsenal. Suspicious of him, Alex takes Cray on without the help of the skeptical MI6. Cray releases a state-of-the-art games console called the 'Gameslayer.' with its first game, 'Feathered Serpent', being much more than it seems. Alex uncovers a plot involving the US government and the international community but is caught spying and forced into a real-life version of 'Feathered Serpent' which he manages to escape by cheating. He leaves Damian Cray's mansion after stealing a piece of equipment vital to Damian's plan but is forced to give it up because Damian kidnaps Alex's girlfriend, Sabina. The two enter Air Force One, where Damian Cray launches nuclear missiles at the drug-supplying countries. Cray kills Yassen Gregorovich, but soon after Alex pushes Cray to his death. He then stops the missiles before they can hit their targets. Just before dying, Gregorovich tells Alex to look for a criminal organization called Scorpia, a group he claims his father worked for. The book was adapted as the basis for the second season of the Alex Rider television series.

Scorpia
Scorpia was published in 2004. Following the advice of the assassin Yassen Gregorovich, Alex seeks the criminal organization "Scorpia" to find the truth about his father. He is soon recruited by Scorpia executive Julia Rothman, and he is trained as an assassin before being ordered to kill Mrs. Jones. He fails in this mission but realigns with MI6 after learning that thousands of schoolchildren in London would die if he did not help them. Alex is returned to Scorpia as a double agent and discovers the broadcasting dishes that Scorpia intends to use to kill their targets, which are later lifted into the sky by a hot air balloon. Rothman's henchman, Nile, tries to stop Alex, but he is afraid of heights, causing him to slip and fall to his death after being taunted by Alex. Alex manages to stop the death of the schoolchildren while Rothman herself is killed when the dish equipment falls on top of her. At the end of the novel, Mrs. Jones and Alan Blunt tell Alex the truth about his father; he was an MI6 agent working as a double agent in Scorpia attempting to take down the organization. They also explain his parents' death, ordered by Julia Rothman after she was noted of his father's treachery along with the true details of the event that happened on Albert Bridge. As Alex leaves Liverpool Street, a Scorpia sniper shoots him.

Ark Angel

Ark Angel, published in 2005, follows Alex's second mission for the CIA. After recovering from a Scorpia assassination attempt, he is sent to investigate businessman Nikolei Drevin, who built a hotel in outer space called "Ark Angel." The hotel was ultimately left unfinished due to high expenses. After Alex's cover is blown, Drevin learns that the CIA is gathering evidence against him and plans to retaliate by attacking the Pentagon. Drevin is killed and Alex is sent into space, moving the bomb to prevent the wreckage from entering the atmosphere.

Snakehead
Snakehead was published in 2007. Taking place immediately after Ark Angel, the novel sees Alex crash land in Australia. There, he is recruited by ASIS, Australia's secret service, to infiltrate a Snakehead organization by posing as an Afghan refugee. He meets his godfather, Ash, while preparing in Thailand, and they team up. The Snakehead organization and its leader, Major Winston Yu, a Scorpia board member, reportedly stole a powerful bomb called Royal Blue, which MI6 wants to intercept. Ash and Alex find Royal Blue but are apprehended by Yu, who later reveals his plan to destroy an island hosting an international summit. Ash is revealed to be an employee of Yu and is killed in the conflict over Royal Blue. Before death, Ash confesses to being  ordered by Julia Rothman to murder Alex's parents. Yu tries to escape before the bomb detonates but is ultimately the sole casualty of Royal Blue's shockwave.

Crocodile Tears
Crocodile Tears was published in 2009. It begins with Alex's girlfriend, Sabina, and her family visiting the UK from San Francisco. Alex goes to Scotland with them. They go to millionaire Desmond McCain's mansion for a Christmas party, but after Alex offends McCain in a game of poker, their 2007 Nissan X-Trail falls into the lagoon. Alex is rescued by a man whose identity is later revealed as Rahim, an Indian RAW agent sent to kill McCain. Alex is recruited by MI6 to investigate McCain but is captured by him. He is taken to Kenya where he learns that McCain will poison Kenya, killing its inhabitants and animals and collecting 'charity money' that he will collect for personal benefit. Alex is nearly killed by McCain but saved by Rahim. Alex ultimately foils McCain's plan, but as they escape, McCain kills Rahim, who Alex then kills and then ventures back to England.

Scorpia Rising
Scorpia Rising was published in 2011. A Greek trillionaire, Yannis Ariston Xenopolos hires Scorpia to return the Elgin Marbles to Greece. Scorpia's plan includes the laying of a false trail to Cairo, Egypt, and blackmailing MI6 into returning the Marbles. MI6 falls for the trap and Alex is sent to Cairo, where he is dismayed to find that Scorpia has been pulling the strings all along. He also meets Julius Grief, his clone from Point Blanc who escaped from an MI6 prison in Gibraltar. He aims to personally kill Alex to avenge Dr Grief's death. Alex is captured by Scorpia and manages to help his long-time friend and caregiver after his uncle's death, Jack, (who has also been captured) escape. Scorpia anticipated this and laid a trap for Jack. The news of her alleged killing devastates Alex but he manages to stop Scorpia's plan and kills Julius. The book ends when Alex escapes and moves to San Francisco with Sabina's family, changing him forever and disallowing him to return to his spy life.

Russian Roulette
Russian Roulette was published in 2013. It is told from the point of view of the infamous contract killer, Yassen Gregorovich. It starts in a small, isolated Russian village where Yassen, known as Yasha, grew up. Yasha is a teenager with a best friend named Leo and parents working at a laboratory, living near Moscow. One day, Yasha's parents reveal that their lab's latest client bribed them into corruption and forced them to make weaponized smallpox to wipe out Russia's enemies. When the smallpox contaminated the lab and the village, Yasha's parents made their escape. Yasha's mother injects him with a vaccine and dies of smallpox while his father dies from a bullet wound. He escapes with Leo, who dies of smallpox under a highway. He travels by train to Moscow, where he meets his parents' friend, a Professor at a school, who betrays him and has him arrested. He escapes the guards and realizes he was robbed by a boy he met earlier at the train station. He goes back and finds the boy and his crew, and they recruit him into their posse of street thieves. Months later, after being transformed into a skillful thief, attempts to rob a wealthy man named Vladimir Sharksvosky. He is captured and sent to work for Sharksvosky at his compound somewhere else in Russia. Before he becomes Vladimir's food tester, Sharksvosky forces him to play Russian Roulette to test his luck. Yasha survives, but when he is questioned, a mouth injury leads him to pronounce his name as "Yassen." Yassen is put to work for many years, often enduring the teasing of Sharksvosky's son Ivan, and being taught by his helicopter pilot. One day, Yassen overhears Sharksvosky reveal he was the client who had his parents' lab create smallpox and vows to one day kill him. Later, the helicopter pilot breaks the helicopter and kills Sharksvosky's usual mechanic in order to get his companion into the compound. The mechanic shoots Sharksvosky and one of the two guards, but the second is killed by Yassen, who steals a gun and holds the mechanic at gunpoint. He and the pilot are forced to take him to their organization, which is Scorpia. He is taken to Italy, where  Rothman tells him Sharksvosky is alive, kills the mechanic, and sends him to Malgasto, their terrorist school. Yassen is taught to be a model assassin, and assassin John Rider is assigned to look over him. In three assassination attempts, Yassen fails the first, John saves him in the second, and Yassen also fails the third. John tells him to run or Scorpia will kill him for failing. But after his departure, Yassen discovers he is a spy for MI6, and angrily heads to Sharksvosky's compound. Using his expert skills to sneak in, Yassen plays Russian Roulette with Sharksvosky, with only one round not containing a bullet this time, miraculously survives, and kills Sharksvosky. Before leaving, he also brutally kills Ivan. Since then, he rejoins Scorpia, kills many others, and then fails to kill Alex Rider after the young agent foils Stormbreaker, and in the end sacrifices himself for Alex, remembering how John saved his life once.

Never Say Die
Never Say Die was published in June 2017 with a US release in October 2017. After the events of Scorpia Rising, Alex is left traumatized by the death of his caregiver and close friend, Jack Starbright. After being given a glimmer of hope about her survival, through an unknown email, Alex is thrust into the horrors of his past in a battle to recover his friend from the dead. Along the way, he encounters new foes (associated with Scorpia) who are nothing like anyone he has battled before. He foils their plans of making rich parents pay to get their children back (after kidnapping the children) so they could become millionaires. In the process, he finds Jack, who then helps him free the children. He then manages to derail a steam locomotive with an improvised bomb (Thermos with diesel in it), thus killing his foes who were chasing after him in it.

Secret Weapon
Secret Weapon was published in 2019. A collection of seven adventures that Alex Rider experienced outside of the missions assigned to him by MI6. These stories occur throughout the series. Four of these short stories were already previously released by author Anthony Horowitz, but "Alex In Afghanistan", "Tea with Smithers" and "Spy Trap" were all written exclusively for this collection.

Nightshade
Nightshade was published in 2020. Alex is battling against a new criminal organization, Nightshade (after the downfall of Scorpia) which Mrs. Jones had been reading a document about at the end of Never Say Die. After the assassination of an MI6 agent in Rio de Janeiro, one of the assassins is caught. It is a 15-year-old boy - Frederick Grey - who was presumed dead. The dead agent's final words tell about a terrorist attack by Nightshade. Mrs. Jones recognizes her daughter, Sofia, when she sees a picture of Grey's escaped partner. Alex is sent by Mrs. Jones to pretend to be Julius Grief at the Gibraltar prison, where Julius was before escaping at the start of Scorpia Rising, and where Frederick is being held; the mission is to learn about the organization Frederick works for. Unable to get the right information, when Alex becomes friends with Frederick, he decides to escape with Frederick and then infiltrate Nightshade's base of operations, an abandoned military base in Crete. There, he learns that Nightshade is using twenty-three brainwashed children (originally 25 but 2 were killed in a "training accident") to work as mercenaries for a group of four Americans calling themselves the "Teachers". Alex's cover is blown by Nightshade's client, and he is used as a distraction while Frederick, Sofia, and 'Number Eleven' try to kill many at St Paul's Cathedral. Alex prevents that by disabling the Teacher's communication system with their child agents. Alex tries to help Fredrick after his capture and promises Mrs. Jones to help her find 'Nightshade', who still has her son, William, as an agent, not knowing that 'Nightshade' is already plotting revenge against Alex.

Franchise

Supplementary books
 The Gadgets - showing technical data of some of the gadgets (17 October 2005)
 The Mission Files - Showing mission data from books 1-7 (6 October 2008)
 Stormbreaker: Behind the Scenes - Information from the film adaptation (2006)
 Stormbreaker: The Official Script - The script of the film adaptation (2006)

Short stories
 Secret Weapon - published 9 February 2003 in The Sunday Times (post-Skeleton Key)
 Incident in Nice - published 9 November 2009 in The Times (post-Point Blanc)
 Alex Underground - published 8 August 2008 in the News of the World Summer Reading Special (post-Ark Angel)
 A Taste of Death - published online March 2012 for World Book Day (post-Point Blanc)

Christmas at Gunpoint was later published as part of The Mission Files, material from which was included in Secret Weapon, along with new material published on April 4, 2019, and which were made available on Anthony Horowitz's website.
Spy Trap- This takes place after Skeleton, Key. Alex wakes up in a hospital abbey where they claim to heal M16 agents. The place claims Alex was in a motor accident, but they claim things that don't add up. Alex ends up telling a lot about himself. Alex has a nightmare every night about a clown. He decides to go exploring. First he finds John Crawley. He then gets a flashback of being in a car with Crawley and Karl ( Head of Security). On a country road they drive into a semi with the clown from Alex's nightmares. Alex finds his phone ( Feng claimed it was smashed) and sends Jack Starbright a message. Alex is forced to run from the hospital people and M16 finds him and he goes home.
This concludes Alex Rider Secret Adventure.

Additional material 
 Resistance to Interrogation, an extra chapter in Stormbreaker
 Coda, an extra chapter in Snakehead
 The White Carnation, an extra chapter in Russian Roulette (June 2014)

Resistance to Interrogation and Coda are available on the author's website and have all been included in certain editions of that book except Resistance to Interrogation, which was included in certain editions of Never Say Die. The White Carnation was later included in the short story collection Alex Rider: Undercover, which was published exclusively for World Book Day 2020.

In other media

Video game

A video game based on the film was released on 7 July 2006, which received negative reviews.

Film

Horowitz wrote the screenplay for the feature film Stormbreaker, directed by Geoffrey Sax. Stormbreaker was an international co-production between companies and financiers from the United Kingdom, the United States, and Germany, and released on 21 July 2006. Intended to be the first entry in a film franchise, Stormbreaker grossed between $20.7 and $23.9 million worldwide upon its theatrical release, failing to recoup its $40 million budget and making the film a box office bomb.

Television series

In May 2017, it was announced that ITV was developing a television adaptation of the Alex Rider novels. The series is being produced by Eleventh Hour Films, with Tutankhamen screenwriter and novelist Guy Burt acting as showrunner. Eleventh Hour Films is run by Horowitz's wife Jill Green.

In July 2018, it was reported that Sony Pictures Television had replaced ITV as Eleventh Hour Film's distribution and financial partner for a new Alex Rider television series. Sony Pictures Television's international and worldwide distribution divisions under Wayne Garvie and Keith Le Goy were attached to the film series. Burt had adapted Point Blanc, the second book in the Alex Rider novel series, for television. Horowitz will serve as executive producer for the series.

The first season was released on Amazon Prime Video in the United Kingdom on 4 June 2020. In New Zealand, the television series is distributed by TVNZ On Demand. On 10 November 2020, the series was officially renewed for a second season and will adapt the Alex Rider book Eagle Strike; it was released on 3 December 2021.

See also

 CHERUB
 Henderson's Boys
 James Bond Jr.
 Young Bond
 Jimmy Coates
 Cody Banks
 Spy School
 Brooks Brothers
 Spy High

References

External links
 

 
Book series introduced in 2000
Young adult novel series
British novels adapted into films
British novels adapted into television shows